Melaleuca faucicola commonly known as desert bottlebrush, is a plant in the myrtle family, Myrtaceae and is endemic to the Northern Territory in Australia. (Some Australian state herbaria continue to use the name Callistemon pauciflorus.) It is a shrub or small tree growing only in protected gorges in the ranges of Central Australia such as the Petermann Ranges and has red, cream or white spikes of flowers.

Description

The flowers red, pink, cream or white. They are arranged in spikes on the ends of branches that continue to grow after flowering and also on the sides of the branches. There are 52 to 71 stamens in each flower, some of which are joined in bundles.

Taxonomy and naming
Melaleuca faucicola was named in 2006 by Lyndley Craven in Novon. It had previously been known as Callistemon pauciflorus since Roger David Spencer and Peter F. Lumley first formally described it in 1986 in Muelleria from a specimen collected from the "Serpentine Gorge in the Heavitree Range". The specific epithet (faucicola) is from the Latin  faux meaning “throat”, hence "gorge", and -cola meaning "dweller in", referring to the habitat of this species, being in gorge country.

Callistemon pauciflorus is regarded as a synonym of Melaleuca faucicola by the Royal Botanic Gardens, Kew.

Distribution and habitat
This melaleuca occurs in the Central Ranges, MacDonnell Ranges and Petermann Ranges in the Northern Territory, where it grows near waterholes in protected sandstone gorges.

Conservation status
Melaleuca faucicola is classified as "near threatened" in terms of the Northern Territory Parks and Wildlife Conservation Act.

References

faucicola
Flora of Queensland
Plants described in 1986
Taxa named by Lyndley Craven